The 1874 Oxford by-election was fought on 16 March 1874.  The byelection was fought due to the elevation to the peerage of the incumbent Liberal MP, Edward Cardwell.  It was won by the Conservative candidate Alexander William Hall.

References

1874 in England
Elections in Oxford
1874 elections in the United Kingdom
By-elections to the Parliament of the United Kingdom in Oxfordshire constituencies
19th century in Oxfordshire